Sveta may refer to:

People 
 Svetlana, a Russian feminine given name
 Sveta Grigorjeva (born 1988), Estonian choreographer
 Sveta Planman (born 1979), Russian-born Finnish fashion designer
 Sveta Ugolyok (born ), Russian model

Other uses 
 4118 Sveta, an asteroid
 Sveta, Demir Hisar, a village in North Macedonia